The knifetooth dogfish (Scymnodon ringens), is a harmless sleeper shark of the family Somniosidae, found in the eastern Atlantic, from Scotland to Spain, Portugal, and Senegal, and the southwest Pacific from New Zealand, between latitudes 58°N and 15°N, at depths of between 200 and 1,600 m.

References

Scymnodon
Fish described in 1864